is a Japanese football player who plays as a striker for J1 League club Nagoya Grampus.

Career
From the age of 3, Nagai spent 5 years in Ipatinga, Brazil, where he started playing street football with his childhood friends.

After he moved back from Brazil to Kitakyushu, Fukuoka, he played soccer at local elementary school and junior high school clubs, before he joined the Kyushu International University High School club, and played two matches at the 85th All Japan High School Soccer Tournament.

He joined Fukuoka University club in April 2007. Three months later, he played at the AJHSST, and won the 33rd Prime Minister's Cup All Japan College Soccer Tournament in 2009.

While playing for the Fukuoka University Club, Nagai also played for Avispa Fukuoka in the J. League Division 2 in 2009 and Vissel Kobe in 2010 as a designated player for development by the league and JFA.

On 23 December 2009, he was named in the squad for Japan's 2011 AFC Asian Cup qualification against Yemen, and made his full international debut for the team in the fixture on 6 January 2010.

He was selected as a member of Japanese squad for 2012 Olympics.

He was transferred from Nagoya to Standard Liège of Belgian Pro League in January 2013, but transferred back to Nagoya on loan from August 2013 to June 2014, due to less playing opportunities given with Standard Liège. In January 2015, the loan deal was terminated as Nagai moved back to Nagoya on a permanent basis.

Career statistics

Club
.

International

International goals
Scores and results list Japan's goal tally first.

Honours

Japan
Asian Games : 2010

Club
Nagoya Grampus
Japanese Super Cup : 2011

FC Tokyo
J.League Cup : 2020

Individual
AFC U-19 Championship Top scorers : 2008
Summer Universiade Top scorers : 2009
Asian Games Top scorers : 2010
J.League Best XI: 2019

References

External links
Profile at FC Tokyo
Profile at Nagoya Grampus

Kensuke Nagai at Yahoo! Japan sports 

1989 births
Living people
Fukuoka University alumni
Association football forwards
Association football people from Hiroshima Prefecture
Japanese footballers
Japan international footballers
J1 League players
J2 League players
Belgian Pro League players
Avispa Fukuoka players
Vissel Kobe players
Nagoya Grampus players
FC Tokyo players
Standard Liège players
Footballers at the 2010 Asian Games
Asian Games medalists in football
Asian Games gold medalists for Japan
Olympic footballers of Japan
Footballers at the 2012 Summer Olympics
Japanese expatriate footballers
Expatriate footballers in Belgium
Japanese expatriate sportspeople in Belgium
Medalists at the 2010 Asian Games
Universiade bronze medalists for Japan
Universiade medalists in football
Medalists at the 2009 Summer Universiade